The Submarine Cargo Vessel is a proposed idea from the Russian Rubin Design Bureau. The idea is to use decommissioned SSBNs (nuclear-powered ballistic missile submarine) from the Russian Navy to carry cargo under the Arctic Ocean. The reason for this solution is that it would be considerably cheaper than designing and producing an entirely new type of submarine.

Concept
The basis for the project is a Project 941 Typhoon class submarine, which was designed by Rubin in 1976. It would have its ballistic missile launchers removed and replaced with cargo holds, as well as receive extra reinforcement for surface icebreaking.

The concept of Submarine Freight Transportation System (SFTS) was suggested  in 1997 by Vladimir Postnikov. Present time this system is considered as a sea subsystem of Global Intelligent Transportation System.

See also
Merchant submarine

References

External links
 Official Rubin site
 Submarine Freight Transportation System

Merchant submarines
Proposed ships
Submarines of Russia